The following is a list of boroughs and small boroughs in Estonia.

Boroughs
Aegviidu
Järva-Jaani
Järvakandi
Kiili
Kohila
Kohtla-Nõmme
Lavassaare
Märjamaa
Paikuse
Pärnu-Jaagupi
Tootsi
Vändra

Small boroughs

A
Adavere -
Aespa -
Ahja -
Äksi -
Alatskivi -
Alu -
Ämari -
Ambla -
Aravete -
Ardu -
Are -
Aruküla -
Aseri -
Assaku -
Aste -
Audru -
Avinurme

E
Eidapere -
Erra

H
Haabneeme -
Häädemeeste -
Habaja -
Hageri -
Hagudi -
Haljala -
Halliste -
Harku -
Helme -
Hulja -
Hummuli

I
Iisaku -
Ilmatsalu

J
Juuru -
Jõgeva -
Jüri

K
Käärdi -
Kadrina -
Kaerepere -
Käina -
Kaiu -
Kamari -
Kambja -
Kanepi -
Kangru -
Käravete -
Karjaküla -
Kärla -
Käru -
Kasepää -
Keava -
Kehtna -
Keila-Joa -
Kihelkonna -
Kiisa -
Kiiu -
Kiltsi -
Klooga -
Kobela -
Koeru -
Kolga -
Kolga-Jaani -
Kolkja -
Kõpu -
Kõrgessaare -
Kõrveküla -
Kose (Harju County) -
Kose (Võru County) -
Kose-Uuemõisa -
Kostivere -
Kudjape -
Külitse -
Kureküla -
Kuremaa -
Kuusalu -
Kuusiku

L
Laagri -
Laatre -
Laekvere -
Lagedi -
Lähte -
Laiuse -
Lehtse -
Leisi -
Lelle -
Lepna -
Lohusuu -
Loo -
Lüganuse -
Luige -
Luunja

M
Mäetaguse -
Märja -
Mehikoorma -
Misso -
Mooste -
Mustla

N
Näpi - Nasva - Nõo

O
Oisu -
Õisu -
Olgina -
Olustvere -
Orissaare -
Õru

P
Pajusti -
Palamuse -
Palivere -
Paralepa -
Parksepa -
Peetri (Harju County) -
Peetri (Järva County) -
Prillimäe -
Puhja -
Puka -
Puurmani

R
Raasiku -
Rakke -
Ramsi -
Räni -
Rannu -
Ravila -
Riisipere -
Risti -
Roela -
Roiu -
Rõngu -
Roosna-Alliku -
Rõuge -
Rummu

S
Sääse -
Sadala -
Saku -
Salme -
Sangaste -
Särevere -
Sauga -
Siimusti -
Simuna -
Sinimäe -
Sõmerpalu -
Sõmeru -
Sonda

T
Tabasalu -
Tabivere -
Taebla -
Tammiku -
Tihemetsa -
Toila -
Tõravere -
Tori -
Torma -
Tõrvandi -
Tõstamaa -
Tsirguliina -
Tudu -
Tudulinna -
Turba

U
Uhtna -
Ülenurme -
Ulila -
Uuemõisa

V
Väätsa -
Vahi -
Vaida -
Väike-Maarja -
Väimela -
Valjala -
Vana-Antsla -
Varnja -
Värska -
Varstu -
Vasalemma -
Vastse-Kuuste -
Vastseliina -
Vasula -
Veriora -
Viimsi -
Viiratsi -
Vinni -
Virtsu -
Viru-Jaagupi -
Viru-Nigula -
Võiste -
Voka -
Võnnu -
Võõpsu -
Võsu

See also
Populated places in Estonia
List of cities and towns in Estonia
List of villages in Estonia
Municipalities of Estonia

 
Boroughs